X-Rated Ambition: The Traci Lords Story is a 2003 British documentary film directed by Simon Kerslake. It follows American actress Traci Lords' career in the adult film industry when she, at the age of only 15, became one of the biggest pornstars. The documentary features interviews with many of her co-workers from that time including porn agent Jim South, photographer Suze Randall and pornstars Tom Byron, Ginger Lynn, Peter North, Ron Jeremy, Amber Lynn and Nina Hartley.

Synopsis
In 1984, a young girl named Kristie Elizabeth Nussman walked into the office of the porn agent Jim South searching for a job. She became known as Traci Lords, one of the most sought-after pornstars of the 1980s. However, nobody knew that Nussman was actually Nora Kuzma, a fifteen-year-old runaway who by the time she was eighteen had already appeared in dozens of X-rated films.

Cast
Traci Lords (archive footage)
Jim South
Suze Randall
Tom Byron
Ginger Lynn
Peter North
Ron Jeremy
Amber Lynn
Nina Hartley

References

External links
 

2003 films
2003 television films
British documentary films
Documentary films about pornography
Documentary films about singers
Documentary films about women in music
Traci Lords
World of Wonder (company) films
2000s British films